The Next Big Thing may refer to:

Music 
 Next Big Thing, a 2003 album by Vince Gill
 "Next Big Thing" (song), the title track from the album
 The Next Big Thing (EP), an EP by Roh Ji-hoon
 The Next Big Thing, an Australian music competition won by:
 Andrew Winton (1997)
 John Butler (musician) (1998)
 Harlequin League (2007)
 The Next Big Thing, a Chicago-area punk band that featured Mark Durante
 "The Next Big Thing", a song by Jesus Jones from Already (Jesus Jones album)
 "The Next Big Thing", a song by MxPx from The Ever Passing Moment

Radio and television 
 World's Next Big Thing, an American TV show hosted by Errol Silverman
 The Next Big Thing (radio series), an American radio series
 The Next Big Thing: NY, a 2012 American reality show
 Britain's Next Big Thing, a 2011 BBC documentary series presented by Theo Paphitis
 The Next Big Thing (miniseries), a Canadian TV documentary miniseries featuring Nikki Payne
 Next Big Thing, a program on Real Estate TV
 Next Big Thing, a category of the Spike Guys' Choice Awards
 The Next Big Thing, a series of TV ads for the Audi A1, featuring Justin Timberlake

Other uses 
 The Next Big Thing (film), a 2001 film starring Marin Hinkle
 The Next Big Thing (video game), a point-and-click adventure game by Pendulo Studios
 The Next Big Thing, the working title of the PlayStation 3 video game LittleBigPlanet
 Brock Lesnar, nicknamed "The Next Big Thing", American professional wrestler and former mixed martial artist

See also
 Big Thing (disambiguation)